Ellie-Jean Coffey (25 November 1994) is an Australian model, softcore actress and professional surfer.

Early life 
The elder of seven, Coffey (originally from the Gold Coast of Queensland) spent her childhood traveling around Australia with her family. Both her parents were keen surfers, and for 10 years they travelled Australia, while being home schooled. During this time she learned to surf and decided to become a professional surfer. The family regularly attended surfing competitions, which Ellie-Jean entered and eventually started doing well at  The whole family surf, and her sisters and brother at times have also reached professional status. Coffey at times has competed with her sister for a spot on the elite Women's Surfing Championship Tour.

Career 
Coffey won second place at the Junior World Surfing championships held in Panama in 2012.  The surfer tried single fin board, traditional style at the Single fin classic in 2015, and dominated the competition, despite not having used one previously  By 2017, Coffey was ranked 97th in the QS world rankings. She is also a model, Her high profile images on her media sites, started attracting a lot of attention, while continuing to raise her profile. This resulted in her getting a number of sponsorship deals from Surf related fashion companies, including with Billabong, Von Zipper and SurfStitch She has also published her own softcore images via her own website 

Coffey has made claims that the surfing competition environment is miosogynistic. She gave up on entering competitions after 2017. She has stated that surf community and competition contains a lot of negativity and even abuse towards women, and the many years she had spent in it had affected her, to the point where she had sought therapy. She still surfs, but only recreationally, and not in competitions.

In 2021, her 1 million strong Instagram account was taken down by Instagram, following complaints. It was alleged the complaints were from vexatious, co-ordinated attacks.

References

External links 
Ellie Jean Coffey – Coffey Sisters

Living people
Australian female surfers
Sportspeople from the Gold Coast, Queensland
Australian female models
Year of birth missing (living people)
OnlyFans creators